Lega Umbria, whose complete name is , is a regionalist political party active in Umbria. The party was a "national" section of Lega Nord (LN) from 1991 to 2000 and has been the regional section of Lega per Salvini Premier (LSP) in Umbria since 2020.

Since 2018 the party has been led by Virginio Caparvi. One of its members, Donatella Tesei, has been serving as President of Umbria since November 2019.

Recent history
In the 2010 Umbrian regional election the party obtained 4.3% and entered the Regional Council for the first time with a regional councillor, while in 2015 it obtained 14.0% and, despite a reduction of the Council's numbers, two councillors.

In the 2018 general election the party won 20.2% of the vote regionally and in the subsequent municipal election Leonardo Latini, a leghista, was elected mayor of Terni, the region's second largest city.

In the 2019 European Parliament election the party increased its share to 38.2%.

In the 2019 regional election the party fielded Donatella Tesei as candidate for president. She was handily elected with 57.6% of the vote and a 20% lead over its main opponent, Vincenzo Bianconi, who was the candidate of a joint list of the centre-left coalition and the Five Star Movement. The LNT and the "Tesei President" list won a combined 40.9% of the vote. The election ended 49 years of governments led by the Italian Communist Party and its successors.

Popular support
The party is a tiny one among the national sections of the LN, but it is recently gaining clout.

The electoral results of Lega Nord Umbria in Umbria are shown in the tables below.

Electoral results

Legislative Assembly of Umbria

Leadership 
Secretary: Alessandro Salvaneschi (1995–1999), Francesco Miroballo (1999–2009), Luca Rodolfo Paolini (commissioner, 2009–2012), Gianluca Cirignoni (commissioner, 2012–2013), Stefano Candiani (commissioner, 2013–2018), Virginio Caparvi (2018–present)
President: unknown (1995–2018), Valerio Mancini (2018–2020)

Gallery

References

External links
Official website

Federalist parties in Italy
Lega Nord
Political parties in Umbria